Suddhipanthaka (Chn: 周利槃陀伽) was a disciple of the Buddha. He was known for being the most dim-witted of the Buddha's disciples, unable to understand the Buddha's teachings, and almost completely forgetting everything the Buddha said.

According to legend, one day the Buddha assigned him to sweep the ground. After a long time, Suddhipanthaka said "The ground is clean, but is my mind-ground clean?" Thereupon he attained enlightenment.

References
Helen Craig McCullough. Classical Japanese Prose: An Anthology Stanford University Press, 1990 pg. 571

Disciples of Gautama Buddha
Arhats